Belonolaimus is a genus of nematodes. They are known commonly as sting nematodes. They are ectoparasites that feed on plant roots, sometimes becoming agricultural pests. They are found in the United States, Mexico, and Puerto Rico.

The genus was erected with the description of B. gracilis from the roots of a pine tree in Florida in the United States. Other species were soon described from various pine species. B. longicaudatus was recognized as an important agricultural pest in the southeastern United States.

These are some of the largest plant-parasitic nematodes, reaching up to 3 millimeters in length. They feed by inserting their stylets into roots and sucking the contents of root cells. They can be found on fruits, vegetables, and turfgrasses or on crops such as cotton, soybeans, and tree plantations. Sting nematodes can cause severe plant damage and have been responsible for complete crop losses. B. longicaudis is considered to be the worst pest species.

Females are fertilized by males, storing sperm in a spermatheca. The females lay several eggs, and there are four juvenile stages.

Species 
There are six valid species, but B. longicaudis is considered a species complex.
Belonolaimus euthychilus
 Belonolaimus gracilis
 Belonolaimus longicaudatus
Belonolaimus maluceroi
Belonolaimus maritimus
Belonolaimus nortoni

References

External links 
Belonolaimus. Plant and Insect Parasitic Nematodes. University of Nebraska - Lincoln.
Sting Nematode (Belonolaimus longicaudatus). Center for Invasive Species Research. University of California, Riverside.

Tylenchida
Agricultural pest nematodes
Soybean diseases
Secernentea genera